Marrison is a surname. Notable people with the surname include:

 Colin Marrison (born 1985), English footballer
 Fernley Marrison (1891–1967), English cricketer
 Tom Marrison (1881–1926), English footballer
 Warren Marrison (1896–1980), Canadian engineer and inventor

See also
 Harrison (name)